Pári is a village in Tolna county, Hungary. It is independent again from 2006 (previously it belonged to the municipality of Tamási).

The former railway section of line 49 between Pári and Tamási were converted into a bicycle trail in 2010.

External links 
 Pári on Google Maps
 Website of the municipality of Pári 

Populated places in Tolna County